Bernardo Mario Stortoni (born December 17, 1976) is a former Argentine rugby union player. He played as a fullback.

He enjoyed spells at Narbonne and Bristol before settling at the Glasgow Warriors where he played from 2007/08 until the end of the 2010/2011 season. He left retired from playing afterwards.

He had 26 caps for Argentina, from 1998 to 2008, scoring 10 tries, 50 points on aggregate. He made his debut for the Pumas against Japan on 15 September 1998.

References

External links

1976 births
Argentina international rugby union players
Argentine rugby union players
Living people
Rotherham Titans players
Glasgow Warriors players
Rugby union fullbacks
Sportspeople from Bahía Blanca